Bobrówka may refer to the following places:
Bobrówka, Hajnówka County in Podlaskie Voivodeship (north-east Poland)
Bobrówka, Mońki County in Podlaskie Voivodeship (north-east Poland)
Bobrówka, Subcarpathian Voivodeship (south-east Poland)